In geometry, the simplectic honeycomb (or -simplex honeycomb) is a dimensional infinite series of honeycombs, based on the  affine Coxeter group symmetry. It is represented by a Coxeter-Dynkin diagram as a cyclic graph of  nodes with one node ringed. It is composed of -simplex facets, along with all rectified -simplices. It can be thought of as an -dimensional hypercubic honeycomb that has been subdivided along all hyperplanes , then stretched along its main diagonal until the simplices on the ends of the hypercubes become regular. The vertex figure of an -simplex honeycomb is an expanded -simplex.

In 2 dimensions, the honeycomb represents the triangular tiling, with Coxeter graph  filling the plane with alternately colored triangles. In 3 dimensions it represents the tetrahedral-octahedral honeycomb, with Coxeter graph  filling space with alternately tetrahedral and octahedral cells. In 4 dimensions it is called the 5-cell honeycomb, with Coxeter graph , with 5-cell and rectified 5-cell facets. In 5 dimensions it is called the 5-simplex honeycomb, with Coxeter graph , filling space by 5-simplex, rectified 5-simplex, and birectified 5-simplex facets. In 6 dimensions it is called the 6-simplex honeycomb, with Coxeter graph , filling space by 6-simplex, rectified 6-simplex, and birectified 6-simplex facets.

By dimension

Projection by folding 

The (2n-1)-simplex honeycombs and 2n-simplex honeycombs can be projected into the n-dimensional hypercubic honeycomb by a geometric folding operation that maps two pairs of mirrors into each other, sharing the same vertex arrangement:

Kissing number 

These honeycombs, seen as tangent n-spheres located at the center of each honeycomb vertex have a fixed number of contacting spheres and correspond to the number of vertices in the vertex figure. This represents the highest kissing number for 2 and 3 dimensions, but falls short on higher dimensions. In 2-dimensions, the triangular tiling defines a circle packing of 6 tangent spheres arranged in a regular hexagon, and for 3 dimensions there are 12 tangent spheres arranged in a cuboctahedral configuration. For 4 to 8 dimensions, the kissing numbers are 20, 30, 42, 56, and 72 spheres, while the greatest solutions are 24, 40, 72, 126, and 240 spheres respectively.

See also 
 Hypercubic honeycomb
 Alternated hypercubic honeycomb
 Quarter hypercubic honeycomb
 Truncated simplectic honeycomb
 Omnitruncated simplectic honeycomb

References 
 George Olshevsky, Uniform Panoploid Tetracombs, Manuscript (2006) (Complete list of 11 convex uniform tilings, 28 convex uniform honeycombs, and 143 convex uniform tetracombs)
 Branko Grünbaum, Uniform tilings of 3-space. Geombinatorics 4(1994), 49 - 56.
 Norman Johnson Uniform Polytopes, Manuscript (1991)
 Coxeter, H.S.M. Regular Polytopes, (3rd edition, 1973), Dover edition, 
 Kaleidoscopes: Selected Writings of H. S. M. Coxeter, edited by F. Arthur Sherk, Peter McMullen, Anthony C. Thompson, Asia Ivic Weiss, Wiley-Interscience Publication, 1995,  
 (Paper 22) H.S.M. Coxeter, Regular and Semi Regular Polytopes I, [Math. Zeit. 46 (1940) 380-407, MR 2,10] (1.9 Uniform space-fillings)
 (Paper 24) H.S.M. Coxeter, Regular and Semi-Regular Polytopes III, [Math. Zeit. 200 (1988) 3-45]

Honeycombs (geometry)
Polytopes